Cambarus coosawattae, the Coosawattae crayfish, is a species of crayfish in the family Cambaridae. It is endemic to Georgia. The common name refers to the Coosawattee River, with the original specimens being collected in the Cartecay River which combines with another river to form the Coosawattee.

The IUCN conservation status of Cambarus coosawattae is "NT", near threatened. The species may be considered threatened in the near future. The population is stable. The IUCN status was reviewed in 2010.

References

Further reading

 
 
 

Cambaridae
Freshwater crustaceans of North America
Articles created by Qbugbot
Crustaceans described in 1981
Taxa named by Horton H. Hobbs Jr.
Endemic fauna of Georgia (U.S. state)